María Eva Duarte de Perón (7 May 1919 – 26 July 1952), better known as just Eva Perón or by the nickname Evita, was an Argentine politician, activist, actress, and philanthropist who served as First Lady of Argentina from June 1946 until her death in July 1952, as the wife of Argentine President Juan Domingo Perón (1895–1974). She was born in poverty in the rural village of Los Toldos, in the Pampas, as the youngest of five children. In 1934, at the age of 15, she moved to the nation's capital of Buenos Aires to pursue a career as a stage, radio, and film actress.

She met Colonel Juan Perón on 22 January 1944 during a charity event at the Luna Park Stadium to benefit the victims of an earthquake in San Juan, Argentina. The two were married the following year. Juan Perón was elected President of Argentina in June 1946; during the next six years, Eva Perón became powerful within the pro-Peronist trade unions, primarily for speaking on behalf of labor rights. She also ran the Ministries of Labor and Health, founded and ran the charitable Eva Perón Foundation, championed women's suffrage in Argentina, and founded and ran the nation's first large-scale female political party, the Female Peronist Party.

In 1951, Eva Perón announced her candidacy for the Peronist nomination for the office of Vice President of Argentina, receiving great support from the Peronist political base, low-income and working-class Argentines who were referred to as descamisados or "shirtless ones". Opposition from the nation's military and bourgeoisie, coupled with her declining health, ultimately forced her to withdraw her candidacy. In 1952, shortly before her death from cancer at 33, Eva Perón was given the title of "Spiritual Leader of the Nation" by the Argentine Congress. She was given a state funeral upon her death, a prerogative generally reserved for heads of state.

Eva Perón has become a part of international popular culture, most famously as the subject of the musical Evita (1976).  Cristina Álvarez Rodríguez has said that Evita has never left the collective consciousness of Argentines. Cristina Fernández de Kirchner, the second woman elected president of Argentina (after Isabel Perón), claims that women of her generation owe a debt to Eva for "her example of passion and combativeness".

Early life

Early childhood
Eva's 1951 biography, La Razón de mi Vida, contains no dates or references to childhood occurrences, and does not list the location of her birth or her name at birth. According to Junín's civil registry, a birth certificate shows that one María Eva Duarte was born on May 7, 1919. Her baptismal certificate lists the date of birth as May 7, 1919 under the name Eva María Ibarguren. It is thought that in 1945 the adult Eva Perón created a forgery of her birth certificate for her marriage.

Eva Perón spent her childhood in Junín, Buenos Aires province. Her father, Juan Duarte (1872–1926), was descended from French Basque immigrants. Her mother, Juana Ibarguren (9 February 1894 – 11 February 1971), was descended from Spanish Basque immigrants. Juan Duarte, a wealthy rancher from nearby Chivilcoy, already had a wife and family there. At that time in rural Argentina, it was not uncommon for a wealthy man to have multiple families.

When Eva was a year old, Duarte returned permanently to his legal family, leaving Juana Ibarguren and her children in abject poverty. Ibarguren and her children were forced to move to the poorest area of Junín. Los Toldos was a village in the dusty region of Las Pampas, with a reputation as a desolate place of poverty. To support herself and her children, Ibarguren sewed clothes for neighbors. The family was stigmatized by the abandonment of the father and by the illegitimate status of the children under Argentine law, and was consequently somewhat isolated. A desire to expunge this part of her life might have been a motivation for Eva to arrange the destruction of her original birth certificate in 1945.

When Duarte suddenly died and his mistress and their children sought to attend his funeral, there was an unpleasant scene at the church gates. Although Juana and the children were permitted to enter and pay their respects to Duarte, they were promptly directed out of the church. Mrs. Juan Duarte did not want her husband's mistress and children at the funeral and, as she was the legitimate wife, her orders were respected.

Junín
Before abandoning Juana Ibarguren, Juan Duarte had been her sole means of support. Biographer John Barnes writes that, after this abandonment, all Duarte left to the family was a document declaring that the children were his, thus enabling them to use the Duarte surname. Soon after, Juana moved her children to a one-room apartment in Junín. To pay the rent on their single-roomed home, mother and daughters took up jobs as cooks in the houses of the local estancias.

Eventually, owing to Eva's older brother's financial help, the family moved into a bigger house, which they later transformed into a boarding house. During this time, young Eva often participated in school plays and concerts. One of her favorite pastimes was the cinema. Though Eva's mother had a few plans for Eva, wanting to marry her off to one of the local bachelors, Eva herself dreamed of becoming a famous actress. Eva's love for acting was reinforced in October 1933, when she played a small role in a school play called Arriba Estudiantes (Students Arise), which Barnes describes as "an emotional, patriotic, flag-waving melodrama". After the play, Eva was determined to become an actress.

Move to Buenos Aires

In her autobiography, she explained that all the people from her town who had been to the big cities described them as "marvelous places, where nothing was given but wealth". In 1934, at the age of 15, Eva escaped her poverty-stricken village when she ran off with a young musician to the nation's capital of Buenos Aires. The young couple's relationship ended quickly, but Eva remained in Buenos Aires. She began to pursue jobs on the stage and the radio, and she eventually became a film actress. She bleached her naturally black hair to blonde, a look she maintained for the rest of her life.

It is often reported that Eva traveled to Buenos Aires by train with tango singer Agustín Magaldi. However, there is no record of the married Magaldi performing in Junín in 1934 (and, even if he had done so, he usually traveled with his wife). Eva's sisters maintain that Eva traveled to Buenos Aires with their mother. The sisters also claim that Doña Juana accompanied her daughter to an audition at a radio station and arranged for Eva to live with the Bustamante family, who were friends of the Duarte family. While the method of Eva's escape from her bleak provincial surroundings is debated, she did begin a new life in Buenos Aires.

Upon arrival in Buenos Aires, Eva Duarte was faced with the difficulties of surviving without formal education or connections. The city was especially overcrowded during this period because of the migrations caused by the Great Depression. On 28 March 1935, she made her professional debut in the play Mrs. Perez (la Señora de Pérez), at the Comedias Theater.

In 1936, Eva toured nationally with a theater company, worked as a model, and was cast in a few B-grade movie melodramas. In 1942, she experienced some economic stability when a company called Candilejas (sponsored by a soap manufacturer) hired her for a daily role in one of their radio dramas called Muy Bien, which aired on Radio El Mundo (World Radio), the most important radio station in the country at that time. Later that year, she signed a five-year contract with Radio Belgrano, which assured her a role in a popular historical-drama program called Great Women of History, in which she played Elizabeth I of England, Sarah Bernhardt, and Alexandra Feodorovna, the last Tsarina of Russia. Eventually, Eva Duarte came to co-own the radio company. By 1943, she was earning five or six thousand pesos a month, making her one of the highest-paid radio actresses in the nation. Pablo Raccioppi, who jointly ran Radio El Mundo with Eva Duarte, is said to have not liked her, but to have noted that she was "thoroughly dependable". Eva also had a short-lived film career, but none of the films in which she appeared were hugely successful. In one of her last films, La cabalgata del circo (The Circus Cavalcade), Eva played a young country girl who rivaled an older woman, the movie's star, Libertad Lamarque.

As a result of her success with radio dramas and the films, Eva achieved some financial stability. In 1942, she was able to move into an apartment in the exclusive neighborhood of Recoleta, on 1567 Calle Posadas. The next year, Eva began her career in politics, as one of the founders of the Argentine Radio Syndicate (ARA).

Early relationship with Juan Perón
 

On 15 January 1944, an earthquake occurred in the town of San Juan, Argentina, killing ten thousand people. In response, Perón, who was then the Secretary of Labour, established a fund to raise money to aid the victims. He devised a plan to have an "artistic festival" as a fundraiser, and invited radio and film actors to participate. After a week of fundraising, all participants met at a gala held at Luna Park Stadium in Buenos Aires to benefit earthquake victims.

It was at this gala, on 22 January 1944, that Eva Duarte first met Colonel Juan Perón. Eva promptly became the colonel's girlfriend.  She referred to the day she met her future husband as her "marvelous day". Juan Perón and Eva left the gala together at around two in the morning. (Perón's first wife, Aurelia Tizón, had died of uterine cancer in 1938.)

Eva Duarte had no knowledge of or interest in politics prior to meeting Perón; therefore, she never argued with Perón or any of his inner circle, but merely absorbed what she heard. Juan Perón later claimed in his memoir that he purposefully selected Eva as his pupil, and set out to create in her a "second I". Juan Perón may have allowed Eva Duarte such intimate exposure and knowledge of his inner circle because of his age: he was 48 and she was 24 when they met. He had come to politics late in life, and was therefore free of preconceived ideas of how his political career should be conducted, and he was willing to accept whatever aid she offered him.

In May 1944, it was announced that broadcast performers must organize themselves into a union, and that this union would be the only one permitted to operate in Argentina. Shortly after the formation of the union, Eva Duarte was elected its president. Juan Perón had made the suggestion that performers create a union, and the other performers likely felt it was good politics to elect his mistress. Shortly after her election as president of the union, Eva Duarte began a daily program called Toward a Better Future, which dramatized, in soap opera form, the accomplishments of Juan Perón. Often, Perón's own speeches were played during the program. When she spoke, Eva Duarte spoke in ordinary language as a regular woman who wanted listeners to believe what she herself believed about Juan Perón.

Rise to power

Juan Perón's arrest

By early 1945, a group of Army officers called the GOU for "Grupo de Oficiales Unidos" (United Officers' Group), nicknamed "The Colonels", had gained considerable influence within the Argentine government. President Pedro Pablo Ramírez became wary of Juan Perón's growing power within the government and was unable to curb that power. On 24 February 1944, Ramírez signed his own resignation paper, which was drafted by Juan Perón himself; Edelmiro Julián Farrell, a friend of Juan Perón, became president, and Juan Perón returned to his job as Labor Minister, at which point he was the most powerful man in the Argentine government. On 9 October 1945 Juan Perón was arrested by his opponents within the government who feared that, with  the strong support of his base, largely unskilled unionized workers that had recently moved from rural areas to industrialized urban centers and several allied trade unions, Perón would attempt a power grab.

Six days later, between 250,000 and 350,000 people gathered in front of the Casa Rosada, Argentina's government house, to demand Juan Perón's release. At 11 pm, Juan Perón stepped onto the balcony of the Casa Rosada and addressed the crowd. Biographer Robert D. Crassweller claims that this moment was particularly powerful because it dramatically recalled important aspects of Argentine history. Crassweller writes that Juan Perón enacted the role of a caudillo addressing his people in the tradition of Argentine leaders Rosas and Yrigoyen. Crassweller also claims that the evening contained "mystic overtones" of a "quasi-religious" nature.

After Perón won the elections of 1946, his administration started circulating a highly fictionalized version of the 17 October demonstration where Eva Perón was portrayed as knocking on every door in Buenos Aires in order to bring out people to the street. This version of events was popularized in the movie version of the Lloyd Webber musical; historians agree that this version of events is false. At the time of Perón's imprisonment, Eva was still merely an actress. She had no political clout with any of the various labor unions, and she was not well liked within Perón's inner circle, nor was she even particularly popular within the film and radio business at that point.  The massive rally that freed Perón from prison was organized by various unions, particularly the CGT, which was Perón's main base.

On 18 October 1945, a day after he was released, Perón married Eva discreetly in a civil ceremony in Junín. A church wedding was held on 9 December 1945 in La Plata. To this day, 17 October is celebrated as a holiday for the Justicialist Party (celebrated as Día de la Lealtad, or "Loyalty Day").

1946 presidential election
After his release from prison, Juan Perón decided to campaign for the presidency of the nation, which he won in a landslide. Eva campaigned heavily for her husband during his 1946 presidential bid. Using her weekly radio show, she delivered powerful speeches with heavy populist rhetoric urging the poor to align themselves with Perón's movement.

European tour

In 1947, Eva embarked on a much-publicized "Rainbow Tour" of Europe, meeting with numerous dignitaries and heads of state, such as Francisco Franco and Pope Pius XII. The tour had its genesis in an invitation that the Spanish leader had extended to Juan Perón; Eva decided that if Juan Perón would not accept Franco's invitation for a state visit to Spain, then she would. Argentina had only recently emerged from its "wartime quarantine", thus taking its place in the United Nations and improving relations with the United States. Therefore, a visit to Franco, with António Salazar of Portugal, the last remaining Western European authoritarian leaders in power, was diplomatically frowned upon internationally. Advisers then decided that Eva should also visit other European countries in addition to Spain. This would make it seem that Eva's sympathies were not specifically with Francoist Spain. The tour was billed not as a political tour but as a non-political "goodwill" tour.

Eva was well received in Spain, where she visited the tombs of Spanish monarchs Ferdinand and Isabella in the Capilla Real de Granada. Francoist Spain had not recovered from the Spanish Civil War (the autarkic economy and the UN embargo meant that the country could not feed its people). During her visit to Spain, Eva handed out 100-peseta notes to many poor children she met on her journey. She also received from Franco the highest award given by the Spanish government, the Order of Isabella the Catholic.

Eva then visited Rome, where the reception was not as warm as it had been in Spain. Though Pope Pius XII did not give her a Papal decoration, she was allowed the time usually allotted to queens and was given a rosary. 

Her next stop was France where she met with Charles de Gaulle. She promised France two shipments of wheat.

While in France, Eva received word that George VI would not receive her when she planned to visit Britain, regardless of what his Foreign Office might advise, and that her visit would not be viewed as a state visit. Eva regarded the royal family's refusal to meet her as a snub, and canceled the trip to the United Kingdom. Eva gave "exhaustion" as the official reason for not going on to Britain.

Eva also visited Switzerland during her European tour, a visit that has been viewed as the worst part of the trip. According to the book Evita: A Biography by John Barnes, while she travelled down a street with many people crowding her car, someone threw two stones and smashed the windshield. She threw her hands up in shock, but was not injured. Later, as she sat with the Foreign Minister, protesters threw tomatoes at her. The tomatoes hit the Foreign Minister and splattered on Eva's dress. After these two events, Eva had had enough and, concluding the two-month tour, returned to Argentina.

Members of the Peronist opposition speculated that the true purpose of the European tour was to deposit funds in a Swiss bank account, although the tour was not an unusual practice and "there are many more convenient and less conspicuous ways of depositing money in Swiss accounts than meeting the Swiss Foreign Minister and being shown around a watch factory". It was unlikely that a Swiss bank account existed.

During her tour to Europe, Eva Perón was featured in a cover story for Time magazine. The cover's caption – "Eva Perón: Between two worlds, an Argentine rainbow" – was a reference to the name given to Eva's European tour, The Rainbow Tour. This was the only time in the periodical's history that a South American first lady appeared alone on its cover. (In 1951, Eva appeared again with Juan Perón.) The 1947 cover story was also the first publication to mention that Eva had been born out of wedlock. In retaliation, the periodical was banned from Argentina for several months.

After returning to Argentina from Europe, Evita never again appeared in public with the complicated hairdos of her movie-star days. The brilliant gold color became more subdued in tone and even the style changed, her hair being pulled back severely into a heavy braided chignon. Her extravagant clothing became more refined after the tour. No longer did she wear the elaborate hats and form-fitting dresses of Argentine designers. Soon she adopted simpler and more fashionable Paris couture and became particularly attached to the fashions of Christian Dior and the jewels of Cartier. In an attempt to cultivate a more serious political persona, Eva began to appear in public wearing conservative though stylish tailleurs (a business-like combination of skirts and jackets), which also were made by Dior and other Paris couture houses.

Charitable and feminist activities

Eva Foundation

The Sociedad de Beneficencia (Society of Beneficence), a charity group made up of 87 society ladies, was responsible for most works of charity in Buenos Aires prior to the election of Juan Perón. At one point the Sociedad had been an enlightened institution, caring for orphans and homeless women, but those days had long since passed by the time of the first term of Juan Perón. In the 1800s, the Sociedad had been supported by private contributions, largely those of the husbands of the society ladies, but by the 1940s, the Sociedad was supported by the government.

It had been the tradition of the Sociedad to elect the First Lady of Argentina as president of the charity. But the ladies of the Sociedad did not approve of Eva Perón's impoverished background, lack of formal education, and former career as an actress. The ladies of the Sociedad were afraid that Evita would set a bad example for the orphans; therefore, the society ladies did not extend to Evita the position of president of their organization. It has often been said that Evita had the government funding for the Sociedad cut off in retaliation. This version of events is arguable, but the government funding that had previously supported the Sociedad now went to support Evita's own foundation. The Eva Perón Foundation began with 10,000 pesos provided by Evita herself.

In The Woman with the Whip, the first English-language biography of Eva Perón, author Mary Main writes that no account records were kept for the foundation, because it was merely a means of funneling government money into private Swiss bank accounts controlled by the Peróns. Fraser and Navarro counter these claims, writing that Ramón Cereijo, the Minister of Finance, did keep records, and that the foundation "began as the simplest response to the poverty [Evita] encountered each day in her office" and to "the appalling backwardness of social services—or charity, as it was still called—in Argentina". Crassweller writes that the foundation was supported by donations of cash and goods from the Peronist unions and private businesses, and that the Confederación General del Trabajo donated three man-days (later reduced to two) of salary for every worker per year. Tax on lottery and movie tickets also helped to support the foundation, as did a levy on casinos and revenue from horse races. Crassweller also notes that there were some cases of businesses being pressured to donate to the foundation, with negative repercussions resulting if requests for donations were not met.

Within a few years, the foundation had assets in cash and goods in excess of three billion pesos, or over $200 million at the exchange rate of the late 1940s. It employed 14,000 workers, of whom 6,000 were construction workers and 26 were priests. It purchased and distributed annually 400,000 pairs of shoes, 500,000 sewing machines, and 200,000 cooking pots. The foundation also gave scholarships, built homes, hospitals, and other charitable institutions. Every aspect of the foundation was under Evita's supervision. The foundation also built entire communities, such as Evita City, which still exists today. Due to the works and health services of the foundation, for the first time in history there was no inequality in Argentine health care.

Toward the end of her life, Evita was working as many as 20 to 22 hours per day in her foundation, often ignoring her husband's request that she cut back on her workload and take the weekends off. The more she worked with the poor in her foundation, the more she adopted an outraged attitude toward the existence of poverty, saying, "Sometimes I have wished my insults were slaps or lashes. I've wanted to hit people in the face to make them see, if only for a day, what I see each day I help the people." Crassweller writes that Evita became fanatical about her work in the foundation and felt as though she were on a crusade against the very concept and existence of poverty and social ills. "It is not surprising", writes Crassweller, "that as her public crusades and her private adorations took on a narrowing intensity after 1946, they simultaneously veered toward the transcendental." Crassweller compares Evita to Ignatius Loyola, saying she came to be akin to a one-woman Jesuit Order.

Female Peronist Party and women's suffrage

Eva Perón has often been credited with gaining the right to vote for Argentine women. While Eva did make radio addresses in support of women's suffrage and also published articles in her Democracia newspaper asking male Peronists to support women's right to vote, ultimately the ability to grant to women the right to vote was beyond Eva's powers. Eva's actions were limited to supporting a bill introduced by one of her supporters, Eduardo Colom, a bill that was eventually dropped.

A new women's suffrage bill was introduced, which the Senate of Argentina sanctioned on 21 August 1946. It was necessary to wait more than a year before the House of Representatives sanctioned it on 9 September 1947. Law 13,010 established the equality of political rights between men and women and universal suffrage in Argentina. Finally, Law 13,010 was approved unanimously. In a public celebration and ceremony, Juan Perón signed the law granting women the right to vote, and then he handed the bill to Eva, symbolically making it hers.

Eva Perón then created the Female Peronist Party, the first large female political party in the nation. By 1951, the party had 500,000 members and 3,600 headquarters across the country. While Eva Perón did not consider herself a feminist, her impact on the political life of women was decisive. Thousands of previously apolitical women entered politics because of Eva Perón. They were the first women active in Argentine politics. The combination of female suffrage and the organization of the Female Peronist Party granted Juan Perón a large majority (63 percent) of the vote in the 1951 presidential elections.

1952 presidential election

Vice-presidential nomination

In 1951, Duarte was chosen by her husband as a candidate for vice-president. This move was not welcomed by some of Perón's more conservative allies to whom the possibility of Eva becoming president in the event of Juan Perón's death was not acceptable.

Eva was immensely popular particularly among working-class women. The intensity of the support she drew from the people is said to have surprised even Juan Perón himself. The wide support Evita's proposed candidacy generated indicated to him that Eva had become as important a figure of the Peronist party as Juan Perón himself was.

On 22 August 1951, the aligned labour unions held a massive rally that they called the "Cabildo Abierto", a reference to the first local government of the May Revolution, in 1810. The Peróns addressed the crowd from the balcony of a huge scaffolding set up on the Avenida 9 de Julio, several blocks away from the Casa Rosada, the official government house of Argentina. Overhead were two large portraits of Eva and Juan Perón. It has been claimed that "Cabildo Abierto" was the largest public display of support in history for a female political figure.

She declined the invitation to run for vice-president. She said her only ambition was that in the large chapter of history to be written about her husband, the footnotes would mention a woman who brought the "hopes and dreams of the people to the president", a woman who eventually turned those hopes and dreams into "glorious reality". In Peronist rhetoric, this event has come to be referred to as "The Renunciation", portraying Evita as having been a selfless woman in line with the Hispanic myth of marianismo.

Re-election and Spiritual Leader of the Nation

On 7 May 1952, Evita's 33rd birthday, she was given the title of "Spiritual Leader of the Nation" by her husband. 

On 4 June 1952, Evita rode with Juan Perón in a parade through Buenos Aires in celebration of his re-election as President of Argentina. Evita was by this point so ill that she was unable to stand without support. Underneath her oversized fur coat was a frame made of plaster and wire that allowed her to stand. She took a triple dose of pain medication before the parade, and took another two doses when she returned home.

Death and aftermath

Declining health
On 9 January 1950, Evita fainted in public and underwent surgery three days later. Although it was reported that she had undergone an appendectomy, she was actually found to have advanced cervical cancer. Fainting episodes continued through 1951 (including the evening after "Cabildo abierto"), with extreme weakness and severe vaginal bleeding. By 1951, it had become evident that her health was rapidly deteriorating. Although her diagnosis was withheld from her by Juan, he knew she was not well, and a bid for the vice-presidency was not practical. A few months after "the Renunciation", Evita secretly underwent a radical hysterectomy, performed by the American surgeon George T. Pack 
at the Memorial Sloan-Kettering Cancer Center in an attempt to remove the cervical tumor. In 2011, a Yale neurosurgeon, Daniel E. Nijensohn, studied Evita's skull X-rays and photographic evidence and said that Perón may have been given a prefrontal lobotomy in the last months of her life "to relieve the pain, agitation and anxiety she suffered in the final months of her illness".

Péron's cervical cancer had metastasized and returned rapidly despite the hysterectomy. She was the first Argentine to undergo chemotherapya novel treatment at that time. She became emaciated, weighing only  by June 1952.

Death
Péron died at 8:25 p.m. on Saturday, 26 July 1952. Radio broadcasts throughout the country were interrupted with the announcement that "the Press Secretary's Office of the Presidency of the Nation fulfills its very sad duty to inform the people of the Republic that at 20:25 hours, Mrs. Eva Perón, Spiritual Leader of the Nation, died."

Mourning

Immediately after Evita's death, the government suspended all official activities for several days and ordered that all flags be flown at half-mast for 10 days. Business across the country was put to a halt as movies were stopped and patrons were asked to leave restaurants. Popular grief was overwhelming. The crowd outside of the presidential residence, where Evita died, grew dense, congesting the streets for ten blocks in each direction.

The morning after her death, while Evita's body was being moved to the Ministry of Labour Building, 8 people were crushed to death in the throngs. In the following 24 hours, over 2,000 people were treated in city hospitals for injuries sustained in the rush to be near Evita as her body was being transported, and thousands more were treated on the spot. For the following two weeks, lines stretched for many city blocks with mourners waiting hours to see Evita's body lie in state at the Ministry of Labour.

The streets of Buenos Aires overflowed with huge piles of flowers. Within a day of Perón's death, all flower shops in Buenos Aires had run out of stock. Flowers were flown in from all over the country, and as far away as Chile. Despite the fact that Eva Perón never held a political office, she was eventually given a state funeral usually reserved for a head of state, along with a full Roman Catholic Requiem Mass. A memorial was held in Helsinki for the Argentine team to attend during the 1952 Summer Olympics due to Eva Perón's death during those games.

On Saturday, 9 August, the body was transferred to the Congress Building for an additional day of public viewing, and a memorial service attended by the entire Argentine legislative body. The next day, after a final Mass, the coffin was laid on a gun carriage pulled by CGT officials. It was followed by Perón, his cabinet, Eva's family and friends, the delegates and representatives of the Female Peronist Party—then workers, nurses and students of the Eva Peron Foundation. Flowers were thrown from balconies and windows.

There were different interpretations of the popular mourning of Eva Perón's death. Some reporters viewed the mourning as authentic, others saw a public succumbing to another of the "passion plays" of the Peronist regime. Time reported that the Peronist government enforced the observance of a daily period of five minutes of mourning following a daily radio announcement.

During Perón's time, children born to unmarried parents did not have the same legal rights as those born to married parents. Biographer Julie M. Taylor, professor of anthropology at Rice University, has said that Evita was well aware of the pain of being born "illegitimate". Taylor speculates that Evita's awareness of this may have influenced her decision to have the law changed so that "illegitimate" children would henceforth be referred to as "natural" children. Upon her death, the Argentine public was told that Evita was only 30. The discrepancy was meant to dovetail with Evita's earlier tampering with her birth certificate. After becoming the first lady in 1946, Evita had her birth records altered to read that she had been born to married parents, and placed her birth date three years later, making herself younger.

Memorial

Shortly after Evita's death, Pedro Ara, who was well known for his embalming skill, was approached to embalm the body. It is doubtful that Evita ever expressed a wish to be embalmed, which suggests that it was most likely Juan Perón's decision. Ara replaced the subject's blood with glycerine in order to preserve the organs and lend an appearance of "artistically rendered sleep".

Disappearance and return of body

Shortly after Evita's death, plans were made to construct a memorial in her honour. The monument, which was to be a statue of a man representing the descamisados, was projected to be larger than the Statue of Liberty. Evita's body was to be stored in the base of the monument and, in the tradition of Lenin's corpse, to be displayed for the public. While the monument was being constructed, Evita's embalmed body was displayed in her former office at the CGT building for almost two years. Before the monument to Evita was completed, Juan Perón was overthrown in a military coup, the Revolución Libertadora, in 1955. Perón hastily fled the country and was unable to make arrangements to secure Evita's body.

Following his flight, a military dictatorship took power. The new authorities removed Evita's body from display, and its whereabouts were a mystery for 16 years. From 1955 until 1971, the military dictatorship of Argentina issued a ban on Peronism. In 1971, the military found that Evita's body was buried in a crypt in Milan, Italy, under the name "María Maggi". It appeared that her body had been damaged during its transport and storage, including compressions to her face and disfigurement of one of her feet due to the body having been left in an upright position.

In 1995, Tomás Eloy Martínez published Santa Evita, a fictionalised work propounding many new stories about the escapades of the corpse. Allegations that her body was the object of inappropriate attentions are derived from his description of an 'emotional necrophilia' by embalmers, Colonel Koenig and his assistant Arancibia. Many primary and secondary references to his novel have inaccurately stated that her body had been defiled in some way resulting in the widespread belief in this myth. Also included are allegations that many wax copies had been made, that the corpse had been damaged with a hammer, and that one of the wax copies was the object of an officer's sexual attentions.

Final resting place

In 1971, Evita's body was exhumed and flown to Spain, where Juan Perón maintained the corpse in his home. Juan and his third wife, Isabel, decided to keep the corpse in their dining room on a platform near the table. In 1973, Juan Perón came out of exile and returned to Argentina, where he became president for the third time. Perón died in office in 1974. That year the group Montoneros stole the corpse of Pedro Eugenio Aramburu, whom they had also previously kidnapped and assassinated. Montoneros then used the captive body of Aramburu to press for the repatriation of Eva's body. His third wife, Isabel Perón, who had been elected vice-president, succeeded Perón and had Eva Perón's body returned to Argentina to be displayed beside her husband's corpse. Once Eva's body had arrived in Argentina, the  group unceremoniously dumped Aramburu's corpse on a random street in Buenos Aires. Eva's body was later buried in the Duarte family tomb in La Recoleta Cemetery, Buenos Aires.

Later Argentine governments took elaborate measures to make Eva Perón's tomb secure. The tomb's marble floor has a trapdoor that leads to a compartment containing two coffins. Under that compartment is a second trapdoor and a second compartment. That is where Eva Perón's coffin rests.

Legacy and criticism

Argentina and Latin America

In his essay titled "Latin America" published in The Oxford Illustrated History of Christianity, John McManners claims that the appeal and success of Eva Perón are related to Latin American mythology and concepts of divinity. McManners claims that Eva Perón consciously incorporated aspects of the theology of the Virgin and of Mary Magdalene into her public persona. Historian Hubert Herring has described Eva Perón as "perhaps the shrewdest woman yet to appear in public life in Latin America".

In a 1996 interview, Tomás Eloy Martínez referred to Eva Perón as "the Cinderella of the tango and the Sleeping Beauty of Latin America". Martínez suggested she has remained an important cultural icon for the same reasons as fellow Argentine Che Guevara: 

Although not a government holiday, the anniversary of Eva Perón's death is marked by many Argentines each year. Additionally, Eva Perón has been featured on Argentine coins, and a form of Argentine currency called "Evitas" was named in her honour. Ciudad Evita (Evita City), which was established by the Eva Perón Foundation in 1947, is located just outside Buenos Aires. 

Cristina Fernández de Kirchner, the first elected female president in Argentine history, is a Peronist who has occasionally been referred to as "The New Evita". Kirchner says she does not want to compare herself to Evita, claiming she was a unique phenomenon in Argentine history. Kirchner also says that women of her generation, who came of age in the 1970s during the military dictatorships in Argentina, owe a debt to Evita for offering an example of passion and combativeness. On 26 July 2002, the 50th anniversary of Eva Perón's death, a museum opened in her honour called Museo Evita. The museum, created by her great-niece Cristina Alvarez Rodriguez, houses many of Eva Perón's clothes, portraits, and artistic renderings of her life, and has become a popular tourist attraction. The museum was opened in a building that was once used by the Eva Perón Foundation.

In the book Eva Perón: The Myths of a Woman, cultural anthropologist Julie M. Taylor claims that Evita has remained important in Argentina due to the combination of three unique factors:

Taylor argues that the fourth factor in Evita's continued importance in Argentina relates to her status as a dead woman and the power that death holds over the public imagination. Taylor suggests that Evita's embalmed corpse is analogous to the incorruptibility of various Catholic saints, such as Bernadette Soubirous, and has powerful symbolism within the largely Catholic cultures of Latin America:

John Balfour was the British ambassador in Argentina during the Perón regime, and describes Evita's popularity:

In 2011, two giant murals of Evita were unveiled on the building facades of the current Ministry of Social Development, located on 9 de Julio Avenue. The works were painted by Argentine artist Alejandro Marmo. On 26 July 2012, to commemorate the sixtieth anniversary of Evita's death, notes were issued in a value of 100 pesos. The controversial effigy of Julio Argentino Roca was replaced by that of Eva Duarte, making her the first actual woman to be featured on the currency of Argentina. The image in the notes is based on a 1952 design, whose sketch was found in the Mint, made by the engraver Sergio Pilosio with artist Roger Pfund. The printing totals 20 million notes; it is not clear whether the government will replace the notes that feature Roca and the Conquest of the Desert.

Allegations of fascism and antisemitism

Juan Perón's opponents had from the start accused Perón of being a fascist. Spruille Braden, a diplomat from the United States who was greatly supported by Juan Perón's opponents, campaigned against Juan Perón's first candidacy on the platform that Juan Perón was a fascist and a Nazi. The perception of the Peróns as fascists may have been enhanced during Evita's 1947 European tour during which she was a guest of honour of Francisco Franco. By 1947, Franco had become politically isolated as one of the few remaining right-wing authoritarian leaders to retain power. Franco, therefore, was in desperate need of a political ally. With nearly a third of Argentina's population of Spanish descent, it seemed natural for Argentina to have diplomatic relations with Spain. Commenting on the international perception of Evita during her 1947 European tour, Fraser and Navarro write, "It was inevitable that Evita be viewed in a fascist context. Therefore, both Evita and Perón were seen to represent an ideology which had run its course in Europe, only to re-emerge in an exotic, theatrical, even farcical form in a faraway country."

Laurence Levine, the former president of the U.S.-Argentine Chamber of Commerce, writes that in contrast to Nazi ideology, the Peróns were not anti-Semitic. In the book Inside Argentina from Perón to Menem: 1950–2000 from an American Point of View, Levine writes:

Biographer Robert D. Crassweller writes, "Peronism was not fascism", and "Peronism was not Nazism." Crassweller also refers to the comments of U.S. Ambassador George S. Messersmith. While visiting Argentina in 1947, Messersmith made the following statement: "There is not as much social discrimination against Jews here as there is right in New York or in most places at home."

Time magazine published an article by Tomás Eloy Martínez—Argentine writer, journalist, and former director of the Latin American program at Rutgers University—titled "The Woman Behind the Fantasy: Prostitute, Fascist, Profligate—Eva Peron Was Much Maligned, Mostly Unfairly". In this article, Martínez writes that the accusations that Eva Perón was a fascist, a Nazi, and a thief had been made against her for decades. He wrote that the allegations were untrue:

The governments that preceded Juan Perón had been anti-Semitic but that his government was not. Juan Perón "eagerly and enthusiastically" attempted to recruit the Jewish community into his government and set up a branch of the Peronist party for Jewish members, known as the Organización Israelita Argentina (OIA). Perón's government was the first to court the Argentine Jewish community and the first to appoint Jewish citizens to public office. The Peronist regime has been accused of being fascist, but it has been argued that what passed for fascism under Perón never took hold in Latin America; additionally, because the Peronist regime allowed rival political parties to exist, it cannot be described as totalitarian.

International popular culture

By the late 20th century, Eva Perón had become the subject of numerous articles, books, stage plays, and musicals, ranging from the 1952 biography The Woman with the Whip to a 1981 TV movie titled Evita Perón starring Faye Dunaway in the title role. The most successful rendering of Eva Perón's life has been the musical production Evita. The musical began as a concept album co-produced by Andrew Lloyd Webber and Tim Rice in 1976, with Julie Covington in the title role. Elaine Paige was later cast in the title role when the concept album was adapted into a musical stage production in London's West End and won the 1978 Olivier Award for Best Performance in a Musical. In 1980, Patti LuPone won the Tony Award for Best Leading Actress in a Musical for her performance as the title character in the Broadway production. The Broadway production also won the Tony Award for Best Musical. Nicholas Fraser claims that to date "the musical stage production has been performed on every continent except Antarctica and has generated over $2 billion in revenue."

As early as 1978, the musical was considered as the basis for a movie. After a nearly 20-year production delay, Madonna was cast in the title role for the 1996 film version and won the Golden Globe Award for "Best Actress in a Musical or Comedy". In response to the American film, and in an alleged attempt to offer a more politically accurate depiction of Evita's life, an Argentine film company released Eva Perón: The True Story. The Argentine production starred actress Esther Goris in the title role. This movie was the 1996 Argentine submission for the Oscar in the category of "Best Foreign Language Film," but was not accepted as a nominee.

Nicholas Fraser writes that Evita is the perfect popular culture icon for our times because her career foreshadowed what, by the late 20th century, had become common. During Evita's time it was considered scandalous for a former entertainer to take part in public political life. Her detractors in Argentina had often accused Evita of turning public political life into show business. But by the late 20th century, Fraser claims, the public had become engrossed in the cult of celebrity and public political life had become insignificant. In this regard, Evita was perhaps ahead of her time. Fraser also writes that Evita's story is appealing to our celebrity-obsessed age because her story confirms one of Hollywood's oldest clichés, the rags to riches story. Reflecting on Eva Perón's popularity more than half a century after her death, Alma Guillermoprieto writes that, "Evita's life has evidently just begun."

Titles and honours
Eva Peron appears on the 100 peso note first issued in 2012 and scheduled for replacement sometime in 2018.

Honours

National honours
 : Grand Cross with Collar of the Order of the Liberator General San Martín
 : Grand Cross of Honour of the Argentine Red Cross

Foreign honours 

 : Grand Cross of the Order of the Condor of the Andes 
 : Grand Cross of the Order of the Southern Cross
 : Grand Cross of the Order of Boyaca, Special Class 
 : Dame Grand Cross of the Order of Orange-Nassau 
 : Dame Grand Cross of the Order of Isabella the Catholic
 : Dame Grand Cross of Sovereign Military Order of Malta 
 : Grand Cross of the Order of the Aztec Eagle 
 : Grand Cross of the Order of Omeyades
 : Grand Cross of the Order of Merit and the Ecuadorian Red Cross
 : Grand Cross of the Order of Honour and Merit 
 : Grand Cross of the Order of the Sun of Peru
 :Grand Cross of the Merit of Paraguay

See also

List of suffragists and suffragettes
Timeline of women's suffrage
Copa Eva Duarte

References

Bibliography

 
 
 
 
 
 
 
 Guy, Donna. "Life and the Commodification of Death in Argentina: Juan and Eva Perón" in Death, Dismemberment, and Memory: Body Politics in Latin America, Lyman L. Johnson, ed. Albuquerque: University of New Mexico Press 2004, pp. 245–272.

Further reading

External links

 Eva Perón Historical Foundation
 casahistoria pages on Perón Les Fearns site, also links to Eva Perón pages
 BBC Radio 4 programme about Perón's embalmed body
 The Evita Project - a social media page dedicated to Evita and the preservation of her legacy
 
 

 
1919 births
1952 deaths
20th-century Argentine actresses
20th-century Argentine politicians
20th-century Argentine women
Argentine actor-politicians
Argentine feminists
Argentine film actresses
Argentine people of Basque descent
Argentine people of Spanish descent
Argentine radio actresses
Argentine revolutionaries
Argentine Roman Catholics
Argentine stage actresses
Argentine suffragists
Burials at La Recoleta Cemetery
Catholic feminists
Dames Grand Cross of the Order of Isabella the Catholic
Deaths from cancer in Argentina
Deaths from cervical cancer
Female critics of feminism
First ladies and gentlemen of Argentina
Folk saints
.
Justicialist Party politicians
Lobotomised people
People from Buenos Aires Province
Recipients of the Order of the Liberator General San Martin
Recipients of the Order of Isabella the Catholic
Victims of body snatching
Women humanitarians